Listed below are the 2001 UCI Women's Teams that competed in 2001 women's road cycling events organized by the International Cycling Union (UCI).

Source:

References

2001
UCI